The Midway Yard is a CTA rail yard in the Southwest side of Chicago, Illinois which stores cars from the Orange Line of the Chicago Transit Authority. Currently, 2600-series  railcars are stored here. It is adjacent to Midway station at Midway International Airport.

References 

Chicago Transit Authority